Bouchea is a genus of flowering plant belonging to the family Verbenaceae.

Its native range is Tropical and Subtropical America.

Species:

Bouchea agrestis 
Bouchea bifurca 
Bouchea boliviana 
Bouchea dissecta 
Bouchea glabrata 
Bouchea linifolia 
Bouchea nelsonii 
Bouchea notabilis 
Bouchea prismatica 
Bouchea pseudochascanum 
Bouchea pseudogervao 
Bouchea rusbyi 
Bouchea spathulata

References

Verbenaceae
Verbenaceae genera